Østerå or Österå may refer to:

Places
Østerå, a village in the municipality of Tvedestrand in Aust-Agder county, Norway
Österå, a village in Västerbotten, Sweden
Østerå River, a river near Aalborg, Denmark
Østerå River (Nome), a river in Nome municipality in Telemark county, Norway

See also
Østerås
Osterau (Broklandsau)
Osterau (Bramau)